Legacy: De Líder a Leyenda Tour is the first live album by Puerto Rican artist Yandel, released on February 3, 2015 on Sony Music Latin. It was recorded at the José Miguel Agrelot Coliseum in San Juan, Puerto Rico on October 4, 2014 during his De Líder a Leyenda Tour. It featured guest appearances by Tony Dize, J Alvarez, Gadiel and Farruko. The CD release features 10 selected tracks of the 2-hours live performance along with a Deluxe Edition which includes 10 additional tracks, 5 of them included previously on Legacy: De Líder a Leyenda Tour - EP.

Critical reception
Thom Jurek of AllMusic said that the album "captures the audio portion of Yandel's first solo tour in 2014, after his split with longtime musical partner Wisin in one of the more successful pop duos in late 20th century Latin music history." -- "Not only are all of the big tracks from De Lider a Leyenda done in absolutely grand live fashion -- but there are several surprises as well."

Promotional singles from the Deluxe Edition
The salsa version of "En La Oscuridad" was released on July 8, 2014 as promotional single from the Deluxe edition of the album with a digital download release, featuring Puerto Rican recording artist, Gilberto Santa Rosa.
The remix version of "Plakito" featuring additional vocals from Puerto Rican singer Farruko and Gadiel (originally featured on its album version), was released on September 25, 2014 as second promotional single from the Deluxe edition of the album.

Streaming releases
"Trepando Paredes" was premiered on August 9, 2014 during the radio show "El Coyote The Show".
The remix version of "Déjate Amar" featuring D.OZi and Reykon, was also premiered during "El Coyote The Show", on November 22, 2014.

Track listing

Credits and personnel
Credits adapted from AllMusic.

 Rolando Alejandro -	Engineer
Alberto Lozado Algarin -Composer 
Sam Allison - Assistant Engineer 
Jesús Alonso -	Trumpet 
J Alvarez - Featured Artist 
Javid David Alvarez - Composer 
Carlos Andrea	Cajon, Palmas 
José A. Osorio Balvin - Composer 
Jean Carlos Camuñas - Congas 
Joash Caraballo - Guitar 
Wilfredo Caraballo -	Keyboards
Omar Cruz - Photography
D.Ozi - Featured Artist
Daddy Yankee - Composer 
Diego De Cáceres - Guitar 
Josias De La Cruz - Composer, Producer 
Victor Delgado - Composer 
Jorge Diaz - Trombone 
Nelson Diaz - Composer 
Savier Diaz - Bongos 
Tony Dize - Featured Artist 
DJ Luian -	Mixing, Producer
Farruko - Featured Artist 
Tony Feliciano - Composer 
Chris Gehringer - Mastering 
El General Gadiel - Featured Artist 
Juana S. Guerrido - Composer 
Sean Paul Henriques - Composer 
Jorge Sanchez - Marketing 
Daliah King - Composer 
Juan Luis Morera Luna - Composer 
Madmusick - Producer 
Gadiel Veguilla Malavé - Composer 
Llandel Veguilla Malave - Composer 
Nelson Díaz Martínez - Composer 
Marcos Masis - Composer 
Marcos "Tainy" Masis - Producer 
Robin Méndez - Composer, Producer 
Victor Viera Moore - Composer 

Pedro Morales - Timbales 
Nelly El Arma Secreta - Producer 
Ñengo Flow - Featured Artist 
Luis Otero - Composer 
Ernesto Padilla - Composer, Producer 
Eliezer Palacios - Composer 
Juan Paz - Marketing
Carlos Pérez - Creative Director 
Pedro Pérez - Guitar (Bass) 
Justin Quiles - Composer 
Soraya Ramirez - Project Manager 
Ramon Gomez - DJ 
Christian Ramos - Composer 
Alejandro Reglero - A&R 
Rohan Reid - Bass 
Reykon - Featured Artist 
Juan G. Rivera - Engineer 
Daniel Luis "Noize" Rodrigues - Producer 
Gabriel Rodríguez - Composer, Engineer
Jean Rodriguez - Composer 
Egbert Rosa - Composer 
Egbert "Haze" Rosa - Producer 
Carlos E. Reyes Rosado - Composer 
Jose Ruiz - Trumpet 
Francisco Saldaña - Composer 
Ramón Sánchez - Arranger, Keyboards, Piano, Producer, Programming 
Gilberto Santa Rosa - Featured Artist 
Pedro Santana - Composer 
Geancarlos Rivera Tapia - Composer 
Jonathan Rivera Tapia - Composer 
Marcus Thomas - Drums 
Adlin Torres - Vocals 
Angel Torres - Sax (Tenor) 
Edwin Rosa Vazquez - Composer 
Roberto "Tito" Vazquez - Composer, Engineer, Mixing, Musical Director, Producer 
Gadiel Veguilla - Guest Artist 
Jonathan Whynock - Guitar 
Fabian Worell - Composer 
Yandel - Primary Artist

Charts

Weekly charts

Year-end charts

References

External links 
 

Yandel live albums
2015 live albums
Sony Music Latin live albums
Spanish-language live albums